Enemy Mine is the second and final studio album by Canadian indie rock supergroup Swan Lake, released on March 24, 2009 on the label Jagjaguwar.

Track listing
 "Spanish Gold, 2044" (Carey Mercer) - 5:15
 "Paper Lace" (Spencer Krug) - 3:44
 "Heartswarm" (Daniel Bejar) - 4:35
 "Settle on Your Skin" (Krug) - 2:59
 "Ballad of a Swan Lake, Or, Daniel’s Song" (Bejar) - 3:41
 "Peace" (Mercer) - 4:08
 "Spider" (Bejar) - 2:44
 "A Hand at Dusk" (Krug) - 6:07
 "Warlock Psychologist" (Mercer) - 5:57

References

2009 albums
Swan Lake (band) albums
Jagjaguwar albums